Oldfield is a small hamlet within the county of West Yorkshire, England, situated north of Stanbury and near to Oakworth. It mainly consists of farmland and has panoramic views across the Worth Valley towards Brontë Country. Top Withens, the house featured in the novel Wuthering Heights, is clearly visible. 

There are no shops in Oldfield; however there is a successful primary school with Mr. JK Travers as its Executive Head Teacher (with Lees Primary). It is part of the Brontë Academy Trust (Comprising Haworth, Oakworth, Lees and Oldfield Primaries). Oldfield has a population of over 100.  The local public house is The Grouse Inn, although there is The Friendly, Wuthering Heights and The Old Silent in Stanbury, a short walk across the valley.

Margaret Wintringham (née Longbottom); 4 August 1879 – 10 March 1955, who was a British Liberal Party politician, was born at Oldfield, where her father was the local schoolteacher. She was the second woman, and the first British-born woman, to take her seat in the House of Commons of the United Kingdom. As Member of Parliament for Louth, Lincolnshire, she was in office from 22 September 1921 until 28 October 1924. A blue plaque was unveiled to honour her on the side on the school building in April 2021.

See also

 Listed buildings in Keighley
 Haworth

References

External links

Hamlets in West Yorkshire
Geography of the City of Bradford